The Jewish Community Council of Greater Coney Island (JCCGCI) is a Jewish non-profit organization based in Brooklyn. JCCGCI was founded in 1973. The organization's Executive Director is Rabbi Moshe Weiner.

Hurricane Sandy
In the wake of Hurricane Sandy, the central offices of the JCCGCI sustained heavy damage. A senior center run by the organization was also affected.

A grant was provided by the Robin Hood Foundation, following Sandy, to ""replace ..  Mobile Crisis Intervention Center with .. trailer .. disaster relief."

See also
 Jewish Community Council

References

Jewish organizations based in New York City
Jews and Judaism in Brooklyn
Non-profit organizations based in Brooklyn
1973 establishments in New York City
Jewish organizations established in 1973